The Indiana Utility Regulatory Commission (IURC) is the public utilities commission of the state of Indiana, led by five commissioners appointed by the governor.

The commission regulates electric, natural gas, telecommunications, steam, water and sewer utilities.

History 
The commission was established by the Indiana General Assembly as the Railroad Commission in the late 1800s to regulate the railroads in the state. On March 4, 1913, Governor Samuel M. Ralston signed the Shively-Spencer Utility Act giving it the additional authority to regulate electric, natural gas, water, private sewer, and telephone utilities along with common carriers (trucking) and renaming it as the Public Service Commission. The act replaced legislation from 1891 in which the state had given cities and towns the ability to contract with utilities for service and to set rates by local ordinance. Utilities with existing municipal franchises could surrender them and place themselves under the commission's regulation by accepting an "indeterminate permit".

In 1987, the commission was given its current name of Indiana Utility Regulatory Commission.

Divisions

Electric 
The Electric Division of the IURC regulates five major investor owned electric utilities: Duke Energy Indiana, Indiana-Michigan Power, Indianapolis Power and Light Company, Northern Indiana Public Service Company (NIPSCO), and Vectren Energy Delivery of Indiana. 

In addition, nine of the 72 municipally-owned utilities operating in Indiana remain under the Commission's jurisdiction for rate regulation: Richmond Municipal, Anderson Municipal, Crawfordsville Municipal, Auburn Municipal, Frankfort Municipal, Lebanon Municipal, Tipton Municipal, Knightstown Municipal, Kingsford Heights Municipal, and Greenfield Mills, Inc. Power & Light.

Natural Gas 
The Natural Gas division regulates the rates, charges, and terms of service for intrastate gas pipelines and LDCs. It inspects federal all intrastate natural gas facilities in accord with federal safety regulations. Additionally, the Natural Gas division reviews gas cost adjustments (GCAs), financial arrangements, service territory requests, and assists in investigatory proceedings when these docketed proceedings are filed with the Commission. It also analyzes various forms of alternative regulatory proposals, such as rate decoupling, rate adjustment mechanisms, and customer choice initiatives.

Telecommunications 
The Communications Division monitors regulatory proceedings and policy initiatives at the federal, state, and local levels to determine the impact of those policies. The division implements universal service programs and provides recommendations on applications for certificates of territorial authority for communications service providers and state franchises for video service providers. The Communications Division also resolves carrier-to-carrier disputes, manages policies regarding telephone numbering resources (pursuant to federal and state law), protects consumers from unauthorized changes to their service, and implements universal service programs.

Water and wastewater 
The Water and Sewer Division regulates 89 of the 555 water utilities and 45 of the 547 wastewater utilities in Indiana. Although the IURC regulates only a fraction of the water utilities, these entities serve approximately 45% of Indiana's water consumers. Approximately 85% of Indiana customers, however, are served by non-jurisdictional wastewater utilities.

Consumer Affairs 
The Consumer Affairs Division resolves customer complaints by ensuring utility compliance with Commission rules and regulations by investigating consumer allegations and issuing timely determinations. The types of issues handled by the Consumer Affairs Division include: deposits, billing, termination of service, customer rights, and utility responsibilities.

Legal 
The IURC Legal Division aids in the development of the commissions “Rules and Regulations Concerning Practice and Procedure” as well as “Rules and Regulations and Standards of Service” to govern each type of utility through Title 170 of the Indiana Administrative Code. These changes follow a rulemaking process which, if applied to Indiana Code, require approval from the Governor and Attorney General.

Commissioners 
The five commissioners are appointed by the governor for four-year terms. No more than three of the commissioners can be from the same political party as the governor.

References

External links

State agencies of Indiana
Indiana